Herbert Roy Pollock  Gollan (29 August 189228 March 1968) was an Australian public servant and diplomat.

From 1939 to 1948, Gollan was senior Australian Government Trade Commissioner in Bombay (now Mumbai).

He was Australia's High Commissioner to India from 1948 to 1952.

References

1892 births
1968 deaths
High Commissioners of Australia to India
People from Gawler, South Australia